Bornholm Museum is a cultural history museum located in Rønne, Denmark.   The museum collects, preserves, researches, and exhibits artifacts in order to  raise awareness of Bornholm's cultural heritage.

History
The museum's association was first founded in 1893. The museum provides a historic view of Rønne and the island of Bornholm, from the Paleolithic era to the modern age, including the history of occupied Bornholm during World War II.
The museum also houses a number of Nordic Bronze Age and Iron Age artifacts relating to the island  conducing.

Notable sites
 Erichsens Gård -  house known for its association with notable visitors including  painter Kristian Zahrtmann and poet  Holger Drachmann, who married the daughter of the house: Vilhelmine Erichsen (1852–1935).

 Hjorths Fabrik - terracotta factory founded by Lauritz Adolph Hjorth (1834-1912) in 1859 and in operation until 1993.
Melstedgård- an agricultural museum south of Gudhjem.   The property consists of an operating farm built in 1801 with farmhouse, stables and horse-drawn carriage rides.

Kastellet -  17th-century citadel which now houses the Bornholm Defense Museum.

Gallery

References

External links
 Bornholm Museum Official site

Museums in Bornholm
Archaeological museums in Denmark
History museums in Denmark
Viking Age museums
Rønne